Dimitar Simeonov (born 7 June 1987) is a Bulgarian footballer who currently plays as a goalkeeper for Nadezhda (Dobroslavtsi).

External links
 

1987 births
Living people
Bulgarian footballers
PFC Slavia Sofia players
PFC Minyor Pernik players
OFC Vihren Sandanski players
First Professional Football League (Bulgaria) players
Association football midfielders